RCD Espanyol is the basketball team of RCD Espanyol.

History
The team played during several season in the old Liga Nacional de Baloncesto and in the Liga ACB until 1991, when it merged with Granollers EB.

Espanyol was the champion of the currently called Copa del Rey in 1941.

In 2018, the section was refounded by the Association of Supporters and Shareholders of RCD Espanyol, as part of SD Espanyol, the project for recovering the sporting sections of the club.

Season by season

Trophies
Spanish Cups: (1)
1941
2nd division championships: (2)
2ª División: (1) 1968–69
1ª División B: (1) 1981–82
Catalan Championship: (2)
1931, 1932

External links
RCD Espanyol basketball info and logos

RCD Espanyol
Defunct basketball teams in Spain
Catalan basketball teams
1923 establishments in Spain
1989 disestablishments in Spain
Basketball teams established in 1923
Sports clubs disestablished in 1989